Elijah F. Pennypacker (1804–1888) was a politician, abolitionist and station master in the Underground Railroad in the United States, leading up to the American Civil War. He operated in Chester County, Pennsylvania. Pennypacker's home, White Horse Farm, was a safe house during the time that he participated in the Underground Railroad.

As a station master in the Underground Railroad, Pennypacker reportedly aided hundreds of fugitive slaves in their escape to freedom, without any having been apprehended by authorities or by bounty hunters.

Early life
Pennypacker was born on November 20, 1804, in Chester County, Pennsylvania.He was educated in Burlington, New Jersey, and began a career as a surveyor and then in Pennsylvania real estate. In this capacity, he made some of the first surveys for the Pennsylvania railroad system.

Pennypacker's political career began in 1831 when he entered the Pennsylvania State Legislature. His terms there lasted until 1835, during which time Pennypacker's work emphasized banking and public education. Subsequently, he served on the Pennsylvania Canal Commission, from 1836 to 1838.

Stationmaster
In 1841, Pennypacker joined the Religious Society of Friends (Quakers). The religious group was active in the anti-slavery movement, and Pennypacker began his work as an abolitionist at that time. His anti-slavery sentiment was influenced by Thaddeus Stevens, with whom Pennypacker served in the Pennsylvania State Assembly. By 1840, Pennypacker was active in the Underground Railroad.

As a safe house operator, Pennypacker is an example of a conductor and of a stationmaster in the Underground Railroad, railroad terminology often being used in this context.

During the time that Pennypacker was active in the Underground Railroad, runaway slaves typically traveled along the shores of the Chesapeake Bay, crossing the Susquehanna River at Havre de Grace, Maryland, and then on to Pennypacker's safe house (depot in the Underground Railroad) in Phoenixville. At that point, Pennypacker helped them to various cities in southeast Pennsylvania, including Philadelphia, Norristown, Quakertown, and Reading, from where the fugitive slaves could realize their freedom. On occasion, Pennypacker worked with abolitionist William Still of the Philadelphia Vigilance Committee to arrange for committee members to meet fugitive slaves upon their departure from Pennypacker's safe house, runaway slaves sometimes departing by actual trains. Some of the fugitive slaves were personally transported by Pennypacker, and none were ever apprehended in Pennypacker's Underground Railroad operations.

Pennypacker's safe house was his family home, Whitehorse Farm, originally constructed in 1770 and located in Willistown Township, Pennsylvania. The farm house was Pennypacker's own home for the duration of his life. During the years prior to emancipation, Pennypacker served in the local, county, and statewide anti-slavery societies.

Pennypacker's activities in the Underground Railroad and those of Dr. Bartholomew Fussell were complementary in Chester County, Pennsylvania. Pennypacker aided hundreds of runaway slaves in their efforts to achieve freedom.

Abolitionist John G. Whittier paid tribute to Pennypacker stating:

In mind, body, and brave championship of the cause of freedom he was one of the most remarkable men I ever knew.

In addition to his involvement in the abolition movement, Pennypacker aided famine-stricken Irish in 1848.

Later life and death
After the American Civil War, Pennypacker became a member of the Prohibition Party, and ran unsuccessfully for public office as a member of the Prohibition Party. He also was a founder and an officer in the Pennsylvania Mutual Fire Insurance Company.

Pennypacker died on January 4, 1888, and was buried at the Schuylkill Friends Meeting Cemetery in Phoenixville, Pennsylvania.

See also

 Quakers in the Abolition Movement

References

External links
 Elijah F. Pennypacker Anti-Slavery Correspondence maintained by Swarthmore College
 Calarco, Tom. "People of the Underground Railroad : a biographical dictionary." Westport, Conn. : Greenwood Press, 2008, .

19th-century Quakers
Abolitionism in the United States
American Quakers
American philanthropists
People from Chester County, Pennsylvania
Quaker abolitionists
Underground Railroad people
1804 births
1888 deaths
19th-century American politicians
19th-century American businesspeople